Roland Morillot (1885 – 29 December 1915) was a French naval officer and hero of the early age of submarines.

Career 

Morillot captained the French submarine Monge when she was sunk by SMS Helgoland on the night of 28–29 December 1915. He ordered the ship evacuated and sank with her as he made certain that his men escaped to safety. The entire crew was saved, except Morillot and two non-commissioned officers.

Honours 
  Knight of the Legion of Honour (Chevalier de la Légion d'Honneur) - French Republic
  [[Gold Medal of Military Valor|Gold Medal of Military Valour (Medaglia d'Oro al Valor Militare)]] - Kingdom of Italy
 Mention in the Army Despatches (Citation à l'Ordre de l'Armée'') 22 March 1916 - French Republic

Three submarines were named in his honour.

References 

 Les bâtiments ayant porté le nom de Monge, netmarine.net

French Navy officers
French military personnel killed in World War I
1885 births
1915 deaths